Addicted is the sixth studio album of Sweetbox. It was released on March 1, 2006, in Japan. The first press edition included a cardboard slipcase. In Japan the album sold over 100,000 copies and reached the Gold Status. The Korean version of the album includes a bonus DVD featuring five live performances. The album saw a return to the upbeat, dance sounds of the Jade album, while incorporating newer musical trends. The album also saw a return to sampling famous classical pieces, heard on 'Addicted' and 'Here Comes The Sun'.

Six of the tracks featured on Addicted were composed by Jade and Geo for Ayumi Hamasaki to release. While Ayumi Hamasaki re-wrote the lyrics (also writing them in Japanese), and re-arranged the songs with many vocal melodies original to her for her own renditions, the versions released on Addicted contain the original compositions, lyrics, and vocal melodies written by Jade and Geo.  Hamasaki's versions appear on her album (Miss)understood.

Addicted sold 121,397 copies and became the 111th best-selling album of 2006.

Track listing

Samples
 "Here Comes The Sun" samples Johann Sebastian Bach's Prelude No. 1.
 "Addicted" samples Vivaldi's The Four Seasons.

Certifications

References

Sweetbox albums
2006 albums
Sony BMG albums